Bank Street (French: Rue Bank) is the major commercial north-south street in Ottawa, Ontario, Canada. It runs south from Wellington Street in downtown Ottawa, south through the neighbourhoods of Centretown, The Glebe, Old Ottawa South, Alta Vista, Hunt Club, and then through the villages of Blossom Park, Leitrim, South Gloucester, Greely, Metcalfe, Spring Hill, and Vernon before exiting the city limits at Belmeade Road.

Bank Street made up much of Highway 31 before it was downloaded in 1998 (all of it south of Heron Road). Currently it is also known as Ottawa Road #31.

Features

Between Wellington Street and Gladstone Avenue in downtown, Bank Street is a shopping and business development district officially known as the "Bank Street Promenade" and the street is lined with common signage affixed to streetlights and street-level advertising billboards showing this distinction.

The area between Somerset Street West and Gladstone Avenue (within the Bank Street Promenade) is considered the centre of Ottawa's burgeoning gay village, characterized by a small concentration of businesses targeted to Ottawa's LGBT community. In 2011, the city officially unveiled signs identifying the neighbourhood as Ottawa's gay village, at the intersections of Somerset, James and Nepean Streets with Bank Street.

Travelling south, there exists a shopping district in The Glebe running exclusively along Bank Street from approximately the Queensway to Holmwood Avenue. Bank Street is home to Lansdowne Park where the Ottawa 67's and Ottawa RedBlacks play. Even further south, after the road passes over the Rideau Canal on the Bank Street Bridge, Bank Street is home to the Billings Bridge Plaza and eventually, the South Keys Shopping Centre.

Bank Street north of Billings Bridge is an historic urban arterial road, often with many more pedestrians than vehicular traffic and significant parking issues, hence the flow is generally quite slow. South of Billings Bridge to Leitrim Road, the street turns into a more modern four-lane (or five-lane) urban arterial, which flows much better despite the 50 km/h (30 mph) speed limit on the northern half and 60 km/h (about 40 mph) from South Keys southward. South of Leitrim it is a rural two-lane highway with an 80 km/h speed limit until the community of Vernon. Recently, just south of Leitrim Road, Bank Street gives access to a developing neighborhood called Findlay Creek that will become quite significant in the long term, and it will also provide access (after secondary roads are extended) to the community of Riverside South.

Bank Street also serves in some contexts as an unofficial division between "eastern" and "western" Ottawa. For example, prior to the takeover of Maclean-Hunter by Rogers Cable in 1994, the street marked the division between those cable companies' service areas in Ottawa: cable subscribers west of Bank Street were served by Maclean-Hunter, while cable subscribers east of Bank Street were served by Rogers.

History

Name of the street
Contrary to popular belief, the street is not named after the Bank of Canada headquarters at the corner of Bank Street and Wellington Street. The street name dates back to the 19th century, whereas the bank was founded in 1934. It's believed that the road was named this because it originally went from the "bank" of the Ottawa River at its northern end to that of the Rideau River to the south. However, the road was originally called Esther Street in honour of Colonel By's wife. Bank Street officially ends at Wellington Street and the portion of the street running closest to the actual riverbank is federal Crown land for the Parliamentary Precinct of the Parliament of Canada. South of the Rideau River the road was previously named "Prescott Road".

As a Provincial Highway

Highway 31 was formed in 1927, and started at the junction of Highway 2 in Morrisburg, Ontario. It travelled north through the town of Winchester, and eventually into Ottawa. The road was paved in stages, but was fully paved by 1936. The road's designation of Highway 31 was extended from the Dundas-Stormont-Glengary/Russell-Prescott county line into Ottawa later that same year. While maintaining its alignment along Bank Street for its entire history, the road was re-aligned along Canal Drive (now today's Queen Elizabeth Driveway). From here, it became less clear where the northern terminus of the road was located, as Ottawa posted Highway 31 as a scenic route within its limits along Heron Road and Bronson Avenue (concurrent with Highway 16) before terminating in downtown, while the Ministry of Transportation noted no changes in road length (78 km / 48.8 mi). This is presumed to be a connecting link between Highway 31 and The Queensway (Highway 417), but these scenic routes/connecting links were all decommissioned by 1960. The road was also re-aligned along the Winchester Bypass, when it was completed and opened in 1974, but no other changes were made to the road since then, until being fully decommissioned as a provincial highway, in 1998.

Bank Street rehabilitation
Portions of Bank Street have undergone major reconstruction each year since 2006. The City of Ottawa held public consultations for a major redevelopment of Bank Street between Wellington Street and the Rideau Canal.

Major intersections (from North to South)

 Wellington Street
 Laurier Avenue
 Somerset Street
 Gladstone Avenue
 Highway 417
 Riverside Drive
 Heron Road
 Alta Vista Drive
 Walkley Road
 Hunt Club Road
 Albion Road
 Conroy Road
 Leitrim Road
 Mitch Owens Road
 Snake Island Road
 Dalmeny Road

Areas/Communities

 Downtown Ottawa
 Centretown
 The Glebe
 Ottawa South
 Billings Bridge
 South Keys
 Blossom Park
 Findlay Creek/Leitrim
 Greely
 Metcalfe
 Vernon

References

External links 

Bank St Biz
City of Ottawa: Transportation Master Plan (see Maps)
Google Maps: route of Bank Street in Ottawa
City of Ottawa: Bank Street profile
Bank Street Promenade Shopping District
Bank Street Rehabilitation Project
Highway 31 at OntHighways.com

Roads in Ottawa
Gay villages in Canada
LGBT culture in Ottawa 
Shopping districts and streets in Canada
Ontario road transport articles without a junction list